These are the full results from the athletics competition at the 2009 Southeast Asian Games.

Men

Track Events

100 metres
December 13 - Round One Heats
December 13 - FINAL
Heat 1

Heat 2

FINAL

200 metres

December 15 - Round One Heats
December 16 - FINAL
Heat 1

Heat 2

FINAL

400 metres

December 17 - FINAL
FINAL

800 metres
December 14 - FINAL
FINAL

1500 metres
December 17 - FINAL
FINAL

5000 metres
December 13 - FINAL
FINAL

10,000 metres

December 16 - FINAL
FINAL

110 metre hurdles

December 16 - FINAL
FINAL

400 metre hurdles
December 13 - FINAL
FINAL

3000 metre steeplechase
December 14 - FINAL
FINAL

4×100 metre relay

December 17 - FINAL

4×400 metre relay
December 14 - FINAL

Marathon
December 15 - FINAL
FINAL

Race Walk

20 km walk

December 15 - FINAL
FINAL

Field Events

High jump

December 17 - FINAL
FINAL

Pole vault

December 16 - FINAL

Long jump
December 15 - FINAL

Triple jump
December 13 - FINAL

Shot put
December 13 - FINAL

Discus throw

December 16 - FINAL

Hammer throw
December 13 - FINAL

Javelin throw

December 17 - FINAL

Combined Event

Decathlon

December 13 - 100m

December 13 - Long Jump

December 13 - Shot Put

December 13 -High Jump

December 13 - 400m

December 14 - 110m Hurdle

December 14 - Discus Throw

December 14 -Pole Vault

December 14 - Javelin Throw

December 14 - 1500m

Standings after Event 1014 December 2009

Women

Track Events

100 metres
December 13 - Round One Heats
December 13 - FINAL
Heat 1

Heat 2

FINAL

200 metres

December 16 - FINAL
FINAL

400 metres

December 16 - Round One Heats
December 17 - FINAL
Heat 1

Heat 2

FINAL

800 metres
December 14 - FINAL
FINAL

1500 metres

December 17 - FINAL
FINAL

5000 metres
December 14 - FINAL
FINAL

10,000 metres
December 17 - FINAL
FINAL

100 metre hurdles

December 16 - FINAL
FINAL

400 metre hurdles
December 13 - FINAL
FINAL

4×100 metre relay

December 14 - FINAL

4×400 metre relay
December 14 - FINAL

Marathon
December 15 - FINAL
FINAL

Race Walk

20 km walk

December 15 - FINAL
FINAL

Field Event

High jump
December 14 - FINAL

Pole vault
December 17 - FINAL
FINAL

Long jump

December 16 - FINAL

Triple jump
December 14 - FINAL

Shot put

December 17 - FINAL

Discus throw
December 14 - FINAL

Hammer throw
December 15 - FINAL

Javelin throw
December 13 - FINAL

Combined Event

Heptathlon
Results
100 metres hurdles
16 December 2009

High jump
16 December 2009

Shot put
16 December 2009

200 metres
16 December 2009

Long jump
17 December 2009

Javelin throw
17 December 2009

800 metres
17 December 2009

Standings after Event 717 December 2009

References
 
 SEA GAMES Federation Office (Results Book) 

Results